The third series of the British comedy-drama television series Cold Feet was first broadcast on the ITV network from 5 November to 26 December 2000. The eight episodes were written by Mike Bullen and David Nicholls, produced by Christine Langan and Spencer Campbell, and directed by Simon Delaney, Jon Jones, and Tim Whitby. The storylines, which focus on three couples, continue from the end of the second series; Adam Williams and Rachel Bradley (James Nesbitt and Helen Baxendale) try to conceive their first child, and get married at the end of the series; Pete and Jenny Gifford (John Thomson and Fay Ripley) have separated after he had an affair with a co-worker. They date different people throughout the series but reconcile in the last episode. After Karen Marsden (Hermione Norris) gives birth to baby twins, her husband David (Robert Bathurst) has an affair with a local political activist, which damages their marriage.

Bullen stepped back from writing the series during pre-production, believing no new storylines could be created for the characters. David Nicholls was one of five writers hired to write the series; when the other four writers were dismissed by producers Granada Television because their scripts were not of the right standard, Bullen returned to write half the series. The eighth episode was the highest-rated of the series, getting 9.66 million viewers on its Boxing Day broadcast. The series won a British Comedy Award the following year, and was nominated for Royal Television Society awards, a Banff Rockie award, and an International Emmy Award. Fay Ripley received a nominated for the British Academy Television Award for Best Actress.

Cast 
James Nesbitt as Adam Williams
Helen Baxendale as Rachel Bradley
John Thomson as Pete Gifford
Fay Ripley as Jenny Gifford
Robert Bathurst as David Marsden
Hermione Norris as Karen Marsden

Recurring 
Jacey Salles as Ramona Ramirez (Episodes 1, 3, 4, 5, 7)
Nicholas Ball as Felix Bishop (Episodes 1, 2, 3)
Yasmin Bannerman as Jessica Barnes (Episodes 2, 3, 4, 5, 7)
Richard Dillane as Miles Brodie (Episodes 4, 5)
Mel Martin as Heather Childs (Episodes 1, 2, 3)
Ben Miles as Robert Brown (Episodes 1, 2, 3, 4, 5, 7, 8)
Pooky Quesnel as Emma Keaton (Episodes 5, 7, 8)

Episodes

Broadcast 
The episodes suffered from ITV's late decision to insert a third commercial break into evening programming; like many other series that had already completed post-production, Cold Feets editors were forced to alter their episodes to allow for the extra breaks. Writing in Revolution magazine, John Owen, the head of media company Starcom, criticised the fact that up to 25 advertisements now appeared during the show. Allied Domecq, who had sponsored the previous two series of Cold Feet with their Cockburn's Port brand, did not renew their contract with Granada. Granada Ventures negotiated a new sponsorship deal with United Airlines, estimated at £1.5 million. The first two episodes were broadcast as a single two-hour episode on 12 November. Episode 8, featuring Adam and Rachel's wedding, was broadcast on Boxing Day—the first time the show aired on a Tuesday.

Awards

References

Further reading 
Nesbitt, James (18 June 2009). "James Nesbitt on Northern Ireland: Drama is borne out of conflict". Broadcast (Emap Media). Retrieved on 30 June 2009.

2000 British television seasons